Aiwo (rarely Aiue, in earlier times Yangor) is a district in the Pacific country of Nauru. Jarrit Morpak is the city's mayor, elected in 2008. It belongs to Aiwo Constituency.

Geography
It is located in the west of the island. It is sometimes called the unofficial capital city of Nauru; Nauru does not have an official capital city, and it is more common for Yaren to be cited as such.

Local features
The majority of the Nauruan industry is located in Aiwo. Among the facilities in Aiwo are:

 The Aiue Boulevard
 Nauru International Port
 The Chinatown of Nauru
 The OD-N-Aiwo Hotel, one of two hotels in Nauru. Privately owned, it is also the tallest building in Nauru
 The Linkbelt Oval sports stadium
 The powerhouse
 Formerly, the Nauru campus of the University of the South Pacific (moved to Yaren in 2018)
 The Nauru Local Government Council chambers and offices
 The Nauru Phosphate Corporation processing facilities and cantilever

The district returns two members to the Parliament of Nauru in Yaren.

The two diplomatic missions on the island, the Australian High Commission and the Republic of China (Taiwan) Embassy are in Aiwo District.

Education

The primary and secondary schools serving all of Nauru are Yaren Primary School in Yaren District (years 1-3), Nauru Primary School in Meneng District (years 4-6), Nauru College in Denigomodu District (years 7-9), and Nauru Secondary School (years 10-12) in Yaren District.

Aiwo Primary School previously operated in Aiwo. As of April 2002 it served students from all parts of Nauru in years 3 and 4.

University of the South Pacific Nauru Campus was previously in Aiwo District; it moved to Yaren District in 2018.

Notable people
The first speaker of the Nauruan parliament, Rev. Itubwa Amram, represented Aiwo. Following Amram, Kinza Clodumar represented the district. René Harris, who served a number of terms as President of Nauru, represented Aiwo in Parliament for many years.

See also
OD-N-Aiwo Hotel
Rail transport in Nauru
List of settlements in Nauru

References

External links

Districts of Nauru
Populated places in Nauru